Angela Procida (born 29 June 2000) is an Italian Paralympic swimmer who competes in international swimming competitions. She is a two-time World silver medalist and a European bronze medalist in backstroke. She participated at the 2020 Summer Paralympics where she reached three finals but did not medal.

Accident
In November 2005, Procida and her family were involved in a serious car accident: her father and young sister died at the scene, her mother and her other sister survived uninjured, Angela was the only occupant of the vehicle who had permanent damage to her lower body.

References

2000 births
Living people
People from Castellammare di Stabia
Paralympic swimmers of Italy
Italian female freestyle swimmers
Italian female backstroke swimmers
Swimmers at the 2020 Summer Paralympics
Medalists at the World Para Swimming Championships
Medalists at the World Para Swimming European Championships
S2-classified Paralympic swimmers
21st-century Italian women